Hornstein, Gorenstein or Gornshteyn is a Jewish surname. Notable people with the surname include:

 Frank Hornstein (born 1959), American politician
 Harvey A. Hornstein, PhD, author of Brutal Bosses and their Prey: How to Identify and Overcome Abuse in the Workplace (1996).  (See Workplace bullying: Further reading)
Irving L. Gornstein, American lawyer
Leslie Gornstein, American freelance entertainment writer and reporter
 Norbert Hornstein, American linguist
 Marty Hornstein, American film producer
 Michal Hornstein (born 1920), Canadian businessman, art collector and philanthropist
 Michael Hornstein (born 1962), German jazz saxophonist
Leo Ornstein (born Yuda-Leyb Gornshteyn; 1895–2002), Russian-American composer and pianist

See also
Gorenstein